Cedric Jashon Tillman (born April 19, 2000) is an American football wide receiver for the Tennessee Volunteers.

High school career
Tillman attended Bishop Gorman High School in Las Vegas, Nevada and was rated as a three-star prospect during his recruitment, according to 247Sports. In February 2018, Tillman committed to the University of Tennessee to play college football.

College career
Tillman played at Tennessee from 2018–2022 under head coaches Jeremy Pruitt and Josh Heupel.

From 2018 to 2020 at Tennessee, Tillman was a backup receiver and had eight receptions for 124 yards and two touchdowns. He redshirted as a freshman in 2018. He scored his first college touchdown on September 14, 2019, in the 45–0 victory over Chattanooga. In the final game of Tennessee's 2020 season, he scored on a 46-yard touchdown reception in a 34–13 loss to Texas A&M.

Tillman became a starter for the first time in 2021. Tillman had his breakout game against longtime rival #4 Alabama with seven catches for 152 receiving yards and a receiving touchdown in the 52–24 loss. His touchdown was a 70-yard reception that helped put the Vols within seven points in the fourth quarter. On November 13, against rival #1 Georgia, he had ten receptions for 200 receiving yards and one touchdown in the 41–17 loss. Tillman was the first Volunteer to record at least 200 receiving yards since Cordarrelle Patterson in 2012. In the regular season finale against in-state rival Vanderbilt, he had his first multi-touchdown game as a Vol in the 45–21 victory. Tennessee earned a spot in the Music City Bowl against Purdue. In the 48–45 overtime loss, he had seven receptions for 150 receiving yards and three receiving touchdowns. He finished the season with 64 receptions for 1,081 yards and 12 touchdowns.  His 12 touchdowns ranked third in the SEC.

Tillman returned to Tennessee in 2022, rather than enter the 2022 NFL Draft. In Tennessee's second game, against #17 Pitt, he had nine receptions for 162 yards and the go-ahead touchdown in overtime in the 34–27 victory on September 10. Tillman suffered an ankle injury in the following game against Akron that impacted his availability and production for the remainder of the season. Tillman returned against Kentucky on October 29. On November 19, he scored two receiving touchdowns against South Carolina. He finished the season with 37 receptions for 417 receiving yards and three receiving touchdowns in six games. He elected to enter the 2023 NFL Draft and not participate in the Orange Bowl.

Personal life
His father, also named Cedric Tillman, played in the NFL for the Denver Broncos and Jacksonville Jaguars.

References

External links
Tennessee Volunteers bio

2000 births
Living people
Players of American football from Nevada
American football wide receivers
Tennessee Volunteers football players
Sportspeople from Las Vegas